Nikola Petrović (born 10 April 1988) is a Serbian professional footballer who plays as a goalkeeper.

Career
After five seasons at Teleoptik, Petrović signed a contract with Partizan in the summer of 2011.

In the 2015 winter transfer window, Petrović moved to Slovenia and signed with Zavrč.

In early 2016, Petrović returned to his homeland and joined Napredak Kruševac.

Honours
Partizan
 Serbian SuperLiga: 2011–12, 2012–13
Napredak Kruševac
 Serbian First League: 2015–16

External links
 PrvaLiga profile
 Srbijafudbal profile
 

Association football goalkeepers
Expatriate footballers in Slovenia
FK Napredak Kruševac players
FK Partizan players
FK Teleoptik players
NK Zavrč players
FK Radnički Niš players
Serbian expatriate footballers
Serbian expatriate sportspeople in Slovenia
Serbian First League players
Serbian footballers
Serbian SuperLiga players
Slovenian PrvaLiga players
Footballers from Belgrade
1988 births
Living people